"Vanilla Twilight" is a song by American electronica act Owl City. The song was released as the second single from his second studio album Ocean Eyes. "Vanilla Twilight" attained chart placement prior to the release date, following the success of Owl City's previous single "Fireflies".

Music video
The music video for "Vanilla Twilight" premiered on March 22, 2010. The video uses the album version of the song and features a cameo appearance by Shaquille O'Neal. The video was directed by Steve Hoover and was filmed on location in Pittsburgh, Pennsylvania, and at the Marblehead Lighthouse in Ohio.

The video shows various people and a dog witness in awe, staring at a swirling mammatus cloud formation associated with a squall line. It has a well-defined vortex which is lit by a veiled sun on an overcast day after a snowfall has blanketed the area, displaying a vanilla twilight. Midway through the video the storm and a lighthouse glimmer with aurora colors.  Towards the end of the video O'Neal lifts his arms towards the cloud and mouths "Take me with you".

Chart performance
On the chart of November 7, 2009, the same week "Fireflies" hit No. 1, "Vanilla Twilight" debuted on No. 95 in the Billboard Hot 100. It has since re-entered and peaked on the Hot 100 at No. 72.

"Vanilla Twilight" first entered the Australian Singles Chart at No. 50 on the week ending January 11, 2010, which happened to coincide with "Fireflies" holding its reign as the No. 1 hit single.

Following the release of Ocean Eyes, "Vanilla Twilight" entered the UK Singles Chart at a current peak of No. 94, making it Owl City's second consecutive single to enter the UK Top 100.

Track listing

Charts

Weekly charts

Year-end charts

Certifications

References

External links

2009 songs
2010 singles
Owl City songs
Universal Republic Records singles
Songs written by Adam Young